Fiona Fung (Traditional Chinese 馮曦妤; Simplified Chinese 冯曦妤; born December 14, 1983), also known as Fung Hei-yu, is a Cantopop singer-lyricist based in Hong Kong.

Biography 

At the age of 16, Fung was introduced by friends to Hong Kong composer Chan Kwong-wing. She then started her career working back stage in Chan's workshop. In the year 2000, she joined Chan's newly founded studio, Click Music. Since then, Fung produced more than 200 pieces of advertisement music. She also worked as a backing singer and demo singer for various artists, and as a vocal producer for movies including the Infernal Affairs trilogy, Initial D, Daisy, The Warlords, and several DreamWorks animations.

In 2003, Fung was commissioned to sing the theme English song "Proud of You" for a real estate advertisement, the song was later re-written into the Cantonese song "My Pride", performed by Joey Yung, released in her 2003 album, and achieved critical acclaim and commercial success. Fung also sang "Shining Friends", the theme song of TVB television series "Hearts of Fencing" and "Find your love", the theme song of the series sequel "Sunshine Heartbeat". "Proud of You" and "Shining Friends" were included in the album "TV Magic". Another song written and sung by her, "Forever Friends", was also included in the album "True Colors".

Fung joined the music company Sony Music in 2008, debuting with her first personal album "A Little Love". In 2010, she released her second album "Sweet Melody".

Discography

Albums

Singles

(^) Single was unable to chart due to disagreement between Sony Music Entertainment and TVB
(*) Single is currently charting

Appearances in other albums

Concerts 

 Jordan X Ekin Concert (as a guest artist)
 Date:  Saturday, 31 Jul 2004 at 8:00pm
 Venue: Hong Kong International Trade and Exhibition Centre - Auditorium
 Presenter: Neway
 Fiona Fung Live 2010
 Date:  Friday, 11 Jun 2010 at 8:00pm
 Venue: Hong Kong International Trade and Exhibition Centre - Auditorium
 Presenter: Sony Music
 陳柏宇x馮曦妤mini live音樂會
 Date:  Saturday, 14 Aug 2010 at 8:00pm
 Venue: Hong Kong International Trade and Exhibition Centre - Auditorium
 Presenter: Sony Music
 Sweet Sweet Melodies Live
 Date: Fri–Sat, 19–20 Nov 2010 at 8:15pm
 Venue: Hong Kong Arts Centre - Shouson Theatre
 Presenter: Sony Music X Click Music

Awards

2008 

Fiona won the Bronze Award for "The most popular new female artist" in 2008 Jade Solid Gold Best Ten Music Awards Presentation, along with Linda Chung and G.E.M. Tang who won the Silver and Gold Award respectively.

2010 

Fiona's single "如果‧陽光" won the "Best Commercial Song" in The 15th Annual Most Popular TV Commercial Awards held by Asia Television.

References

External links 
 Fiona Fung's Official Website (Sony Music Label)
 
 
 

Cantopop singers
Hong Kong Mandopop singers
English-language singers from Hong Kong
1983 births
Living people
Asian Wave contestants
21st-century Hong Kong women singers